Minuscule 251 (in the Gregory-Aland numbering), ε 192 (Soden), is a Greek minuscule manuscript of the New Testament, on parchment. Paleographically it has been assigned to the 12th century.
The manuscript has complex contents.

Description 

The codex contains a complete text of the four Gospels on 270 parchment leaves. The text is written in one column per page and 31 lines per page.

The text is divided according to the small Ammonian sections, whose numbers are given at the margin, but without references to the Eusebian Canons. 

It has pictures. 

The text has some affinities with codex 59.

Text 

The Greek text of the codex has some the Byzantine readings, but it is not pure the Byzantine text. Hermann von Soden lists as II. Aland did not assign it to any Category.

According to the Claremont Profile Method it belongs to the textual cluster 1229.

Textually it is close to the Codex Tischendorfianus IV.

History 

The manuscript once belonged to Auxentius. Theophilus Zagoloras sent it to one of the monasteries at Athos peninsula in A.D. 1400. It was brought to Moscow in 1655, by the monk Arsenius, on the suggestion of the Patriarch Nikon, in the reign of Alexei Mikhailovich Romanov (1645-1676). The manuscript was collated by C. F. Matthaei. It was examined by Matthaei and Franz Delitzsch.

The manuscript is currently housed at the Russian State Library (F. 181. 9 (Gr. 9)) in Moscow.

See also 

 List of New Testament minuscules
 Biblical manuscript
 Textual criticism

References

Further reading 

 C. F. Matthei, Novum Testamentum Graece et Latine, (Riga, 1782-1788).
 Kurt Treu, Die Griechischen Handschriften des Neuen Testaments in der UdSSR; eine systematische Auswertung des Texthandschriften in Leningrad, Moskau, Kiev, Odessa, Tbilisi und Erevan, T & U 90 (Berlin, 1966), pp. 311-313.

External links 

 Minuscule 251 at the Encyclopedia of Textual Criticism

Greek New Testament minuscules
12th-century biblical manuscripts